Frederick Douglass is an opera in three acts composed by Ulysses Kay to a libretto by Donald Dorr. Its story is a semi-fictionalized account of the final years in the life of Frederick Douglass after his marriage to his second wife, Helen Pitts Douglass. The opera premiered on April 12, 1991, at Newark Symphony Hall performed by the New Jersey State Opera in a production directed by Louis Johnson and designed by Salvatore Tagliarino.

Background
In 1978 it was announced that both Kay and Dorr received grants from the National Endowment for the Arts to work on the opera. Dorr and Kay worked on the opera beginning in 1979 and completed it in 1985.

Roles

References

Sources

Further reading

 

Operas by Ulysses Kay
1985 operas
English-language operas
Operas set in the United States
Operas set in the 19th century
Operas
Cultural depictions of Frederick Douglass
National Endowment for the Arts